George Frederick Cannon (15 February 1891 – 4 January 1951) was an English professional football inside right who played in the Football League for Fulham.

Personal life 
Cannon worked as a private secretary and served in the Royal Air Force during the First World War.

Career statistics

References

1891 births
1951 deaths
Footballers from Hammersmith
English footballers
Association football inside forwards
Tooting & Mitcham United F.C. players
Fulham F.C. players
Brentford F.C. players
Wimbledon F.C. players
Margate F.C. players
English Football League players
Southern Football League players
Royal Air Force personnel of World War I